The 2021 Suzuki Polish Basketball Cup was the 57th edition of Poland's national cup competition for men basketball teams. It was managed by the Polish Basketball League (PLK) and was held in Lublin, in the Globus. Zastal Zielona Góra won its third Cup title in club history.

Qualified teams
The eight first qualified after the first half of the 2020–21 PLK season qualified to the tournament. The highest-placed four teams would play the lowest-seeded teams in the quarter-finals. Start Lublin qualified as host of the tournament, and gained automatic qualification.

Bracket

Final

See also
2020–21 PLK season

References

External links
Official Site
Results page for 2020–21

Polish Basketball Cup
Cup